Isaac William Marsh (1 February 1877 – 1949) was an English footballer who played in the Football League for Doncaster Rovers, Gainsborough Trinity and Notts County. Marsh scored Doncaster Rovers' first Football League hat-trick which came in a 4–1 win against Chesterfield Town on 11 January 1902.

References

1877 births
1949 deaths
English footballers
Association football midfielders
English Football League players
Burton Wanderers F.C. players
Northfleet United F.C. players
Gainsborough Trinity F.C. players
Notts County F.C. players
Newark Town F.C. players
Doncaster Rovers F.C. players
Worksop Town F.C. players
Denaby United F.C. players
Chesterfield F.C. players